Wood Dale is a station on Metra's Milwaukee District West Line in Wood Dale, Illinois. In Metra's zone-based fare system, Wood Dale is in zone D. As of 2018, Wood Dale is the 83rd busiest of Metra's 236 non-downtown stations, with an average of 596 weekday boardings.

As of December 12, 2022, Wood Dale is served by 42 trains (20 inbound, 22 outbound) on weekdays, by all 24 trains (12 in each direction) on Saturdays, and by all 18 trains (nine in each direction) on Sundays and holidays.

History
The station was opened in 1930. Sixteen years later, the station was rebuilt. In 1992, Metra funded a 149 space expansion of the commuter parking lot. That same year, the station became part of the first Pace bus route to be subsidized by Metra. In 2004, a man was struck and killed near the station while trying to take a shortcut to work. In 2009, the city began construction of a new station as part of a larger transit-oriented development strategy. The new prairie style station was completed in 2012.

Gallery

References

External links 

Station from Irving Park Road from Google Maps Street View

Metra stations in Illinois
Former Chicago, Milwaukee, St. Paul and Pacific Railroad stations
Railway stations in DuPage County, Illinois
Railway stations in the United States opened in 1930